The Man and His Kingdom is an 1899 novel by the English novelist E. Phillips Oppenheim. It is an adventure novel set in South America.

Film adaptation
In 1922 the novel was turned into a film Man and His Kingdom directed by Maurice Elvey.

References

Bibliography
 Goble, Alan. The Complete Index to Literary Sources in Film. Walter de Gruyter, 1999.

1899 British novels
Novels by E. Phillips Oppenheim
British novels adapted into films